Tate Stevens is the eponymous major-label debut studio album by American country singer Tate Stevens. It was released on April 23, 2013 via RCA Nashville and Syco Music, and is his first album after winning the second season of The X Factor. "Power of a Love Song" was released as the album's lead single on March 12, 2013. Another track, "Holler If You're with Me," was given a music video and used to promote Pepsi.

Commercial performance
The album sold over 17,000 units, debuting at number 18 on the Billboard 200, and at number 4 on the US Top Country Albums. As of July 11, 2013, the album has sold 38,000 copies in the US.

Track listing

Personnel
Jeremy Asbrock- choir
Pat Buchanan- electric guitar
Ryan Cook- choir
J.T. Corenflos- electric guitar
Glen Duncan- banjo, fiddle, acoustic guitar
Wes Hightower- background vocals
Mark Hill- bass guitar
Steve Hinson- dobro, steel guitar, slide guitar
John Hobbs- keyboards 
Devin Malone- cello, electric guitar, percussion
Greg Morrow- drums, percussion
Philip Shouse- choir
Tate Stevens- choir, lead vocals
Paul Taylor- choir
Russell Terrell- background vocals
Ilya Toshinsky- banjo, acoustic guitar
Jason Waters- percussion 
John Willis- acoustic guitar
Deano Workman- choir

Chart performance

Album

Singles

References

2013 debut albums
Tate Stevens albums
RCA Records albums
Syco Music albums
Albums produced by Blake Chancey